Björn Phau was the defending champion but decided not to participate.
Michał Przysiężny defeated Jan-Lennard Struff 4–6, 7–6(7–5), 7–6(7–5) in the final to win the title.

Seeds

Draw

Finals

Top half

Bottom half

References
 Main Draw
 Qualifying Draw

Trofeo Faip-Perrel - Singles
2013 Singles